Mike Leggo (born October 7, 1964) is a retired National Hockey League referee. His career started in the 1996–97 NHL season, and wore the uniform number 3. He was selected to work games in the ice hockey men's tournament at the 2014 Winter Olympics in Sochi, Russia.

On October 14, 2014, he worked his 1,000th game against the Edmonton Oilers and the Los Angeles Kings at the Staples Center.

He worked his final NHL game when the Los Angeles Kings and the Arizona Coyotes played each other on April 2, 2017.

References

1964 births
Living people
Ice hockey people from Ontario
National Hockey League officials
Sportspeople from North Bay, Ontario